A hitchhiker is someone who goes hitchhiking.

Hitchhiker, The Hitchhiker or The Hitch-Hiker may also refer to:

Film and television
 The Hitch-Hiker, a 1953 film noir directed by Ida Lupino
 The Hitchhiker (film), a 2007 low-budget horror film
 "The Hitchhiker", a segment from the 1987 horror film Creepshow 2
 The Hitchhiker (TV series), a mystery anthology series that aired from 1983 to 1987
 "The Hitch-Hiker" (The Twilight Zone), an episode of the original Twilight Zone series
 "The Hitchhikers", a season 6 episode of the TV show Diff'rent Strokes

Music
 Hitchhiker (album), by Neil Young, recorded in 1976 and released in 2017, and its title track
 "Hitchhiker", a song by Pearl Jam from the 2003 album Lost Dogs
 "Hitchhiker", a song by Cowboy Mouth from the 1994 album It Means Escape
 "Hitchhiker", a song by Neil Young from the 2010 album Le Noise (re-released on the eponymous 2017 album)
 "Hitchhiker", a song by Demi Lovato from the 2017 album Tell Me You Love Me
 "Hitchhiker", a 1966 song and album by Gary Young
 "Hitchhiker", a song by Macabre from the 2000 album Dahmer
 "Hitchhiker", a song by John Denver from the 1976 album Spirit
 "Hitchhiker", a song by Teitur Lassen from the 2006 album Stay Under the Stars
 "Hitchhiker", a comedy track by Steven Wright from the 2007 album I Still Have a Pony
 "Hitch Hike" (song), by Marvin Gaye, 1962
 Hitch hike (dance), a dance craze started by the song

Other uses
 The Hitch-Hiker (radio play), a story by Lucille Fletcher first presented on The Orson Welles Show in 1941
 "The Hitch-Hiker" (short story), a 1977 short story by Roald Dahl featured in The Wonderful Story of Henry Sugar and Six More
 Hitchhiker Program, a discontinued NASA program

See also
 Hitchhike (disambiguation)
 The Hitcher (disambiguation)
 The Hitchhiker's Guide to the Galaxy